The thirteenth series of The Great British Bake Off began on 13 September 2022. It is again presented by Noel Fielding and Matt Lucas and judged by Paul Hollywood and Prue Leith. The bakers competing in the series were announced on 2 September 2022. The series was filmed at Welford Park, an estate near Newbury, Berkshire which was previously used for the programme from 2014 to 2019.

The season was won by Syabira Yusoff, with Abdul Rehman Sharif and Nelsandro "Sandro" Farmhouse finishing as the runners-up. Yusoff is the first female winner since Sophie Faldo from Season 8.

This was the final series presented by Matt Lucas, who announced his departure from the programme on 6 December 2022.

Bakers

Results summary 

 Abdul and Rebs were ill and unable to compete in episode 3; at the end of the episode, the judges decided it was unfair to eliminate anyone in their absence.

Colour key:

Episodes

Episode 1: Cake 
For the first signature challenge, the bakers were required to bake 12 identical mini sandwich cakes in 2 hours. For the technical challenge, set by Paul, the bakers were tasked with making a six-layered red velvet cake in 2 hours, each layer sandwiched with cream cheese frosting and sprinkled with red crumbs. A 3D cake replica of a home that the bakers once lived in was set as the showstopper; the bakers were given 4 hours, the judges expecting the bake to be full of detail.

Episode 2: Biscuits 
The signature bake was 18 Decorative macarons with a twist – they must be made to appear like something else. Two hours was given for the challenge. For the technical challenge, set by Prue, the bakers were given 1 hour and 45 minutes to bake 12 Garibaldi biscuits with feathered chocolate on top. A 3D biscuit mask to be completed in 4 hours was the showstopper challenge.

Episode 3: Bread 
The bakers were set the task of making two sharing-size pizzas in 2 hours for the signature challenge. The technical challenge, set by Paul, was the baking of 12 pain aux raisins, to be completed in 2 hours and 45 minutes. Finally, for their 4½-hour showstopper, the bakers were asked to create their own interpretation of a Swedish celebration 'cake', the Smörgåstårta, topped with exquisite decorations.

Both Abdul and Rebs did not compete due to falling ill. Consequently, no one was eliminated this week but the following week would be a double elimination.

Episode 4: Mexican

Episode 5: Desserts

Episode 6: Halloween

Episode 7: Custard

Episode 8: Pastry

Episode 9: Pâtisserie (Semi-final)

Episode 10: Final

Reception 
Fans on social media criticised the thirteenth series, including the following aspects of the final week: time limit as too short, tasks as heavily complex within time allowed, bakes as short on quality, and judges' perceived overly negative comments.

Besides what fans noted, Nicola Austin of Digital Spy further criticised the series's Technical challenges as the production's intentions for amateur bakers "to fail", highlight one-step instruction, "Make a lemon meringue pie", for week five's (Dessert) "Lemon Meringue Pie"; and lack of instructions to properly use vegetarian gelatin for the finale's "Summer Pudding Bombe". Austin further stated, "[M]uch of the judges' precise specifications, timings and presentation requirements now lean more towards professional standards," different from what Bake Off initially intended to be. She further criticised the series's "stereotypical presentation of Mexican culture" in episode five and other "faux pas on display", like Halloween-themed bakes in episode six and spring rolls as a Technical challenge.

Ratings

References 

2022 British television seasons
Series 13